13th ADG Awards
February 14, 2009

Contemporary Film: 
 Slumdog Millionaire 

Fantasy Film: 
 The Dark Knight 

Period Film: 
 The Curious Case of Benjamin Button 

The 13th Art Directors Guild Awards, which were given on February 14, 2009, honored the best production designers of films and televisions in 2008.

Winners and Nominees

Film
 Contemporary Film:
Mark Digby – Slumdog Millionaire
Jess Gonchor – Burn After Reading
James J. Murakami – Gran Torino
Dennis Gassner – Quantum of Solace
Timothy Grimes – The Wrestler

 Fantasy Film:
Nathan Crowley – The Dark Knight
Guy Hendrix Dyas – Indiana Jones and the Kingdom of the Crystal Skull
J. Michael Riva – Iron Man
James D. Bissell – The Spiderwick Chronicles
Ralph Eggleston – WALL-E

 Period Film:
Donald Graham Burt – The Curious Case of Benjamin Button
 James J. Murakami – Changeling
 David Gropman – Doubt
 Michael Corenblith – Frost/Nixon
 Bill Groom – Milk

Television
 Episode of One Hour Single-Camera Series:
Dan Bishop – Mad Men for "The Jet Set"
Michael Wylie – Pushing Daisies for "Bzzzzzzzzz!"
Suzuki Ingerslev – True Blood for "Burning House of Love"
Tom Conroy – The Tudors for "Episode 210"
Mark Worthington – Ugly Betty for "When Betty Met Yeti"

 Miniseries or Television Film:
Gemma Jackson – John Adams
Jerry Wanek – The Andromeda Strain
Robb Wilson King – The Librarian: Curse of the Judas Chalice
Yuda Acco – Lone Rider
Patti Podesta – Recount

Art Directors Guild Awards
2008 film awards
2008 guild awards
2009 in American cinema